Onís is a municipality and a parish in the Autonomous Community of the Principality of Asturias, Spain. The municipality is bordered on the north by Llanes, on the south by the province of León, to the east by Cabrales and to the west by Cangas de Onís.

The area of the municipality is 75 km2, being more of a third of its territory in the Picos de Europa National Park. The population is dispersed over various population centers, being its capital de Benia de Onís. In 2007, the population is of 920 inhabitants, increasing remarkably during holiday times.

The source of the Güeña River, main affluent of the Sella River, is lowest point of the municipality with 175 m. Part of the Picos de Europa, the Pico de  Verdilluenga is the highest point of the municipality with 2,129 m.

The municipality consists of three parishes: 
Onís: including the settlements of Benia (Benia de Onís), Avín, El Castru, Los Menores, Pandellavandes, Silviella, Talaveru, Villar.
Bobia: including the settlements of Bobia de Abajo (Bovia Baxu), Bobia de Arriba (Bovia Riba), Demués, Gamonéu.
La Robellada: including the settlements of La Robellada and El Pedroso (Pedrosu)

Notes

External links 
Federación Asturiana de Concejos 

Municipalities in Asturias